Mauritius competed at the 2014 Summer Youth Olympics, in Nanjing, China from 16 August to 28 August 2014.

Athletics

Mauritius qualified one athlete.

Qualification Legend: Q=Final A (medal); qB=Final B (non-medal); qC=Final C (non-medal); qD=Final D (non-medal); qE=Final E (non-medal)

Boys
Track & road events

Cycling

Mauritius qualified a girls' team based on its ranking issued by the UCI.

Team

Mixed Relay

Swimming

Mauritius qualified one swimmer.

Girls

References

You
Nations at the 2014 Summer Youth Olympics
Mauritius at the Youth Olympics